"Head over Heels" is a song recorded by British band Tears for Fears for their second studio album Songs from the Big Chair (1985). The song was released by Mercury Records, as the album's fourth single – initially on 10 June 1985 in Germany and then on 14 June in the UK. It was the band's tenth single release in the United Kingdom and eighth top 40 hit in the region, peaking at number 12. In the United States, it was the third single from the album and continued the band's run of hits there, peaking at number three on the Billboard Hot 100 chart. A limited edition four-leaf-clover-shaped picture disc was issued for the single's release in the UK. The song was also an international success, reaching the top 40 in several countries.

Background

"Head over Heels" had been developed nearly two years prior as part of a segue with the song "Broken", which was previously a stand-alone B-side to the 1983 "Pale Shelter" single. As the two songs share the same piano/synth motif, "Head over Heels" eventually came to be sandwiched in between two bookend parts of "Broken" in live performances. This placement carried over to the final track listing of the Big Chair LP, with a newer studio recording of "Broken" preceding "Head over Heels", followed by a live reprise taken from a December 1983 concert recording (previously released as the "In My Mind's Eye" VHS).

The song features Roland Orzabal on lead vocals, with Curt Smith singing a couple of lines in the background during the second verse.

Meaning

Reception
Cash Box called it "another searching lyric and richly evocative melody."

Song versions

"Head over Heels" has seen only three official remixes since its release.

The 12" version was titled the "Preacher Mix" and is an extended remix of the entire "Broken/Head Over Heels/Broken" medley. The mix was done by producer Chris Hughes and features an unusual spoken word intro in which Roland Orzabal recites lyrics from the song "I Believe" in the style of a preacher. This mix contains the only released studio recording of the "Broken" reprise (the version on the Songs from the Big Chair album is a live recording). The sung vocals from the album version of "Broken" are completely absent, as is the lead guitar line.

The 7" remix was done by David Bascombe and notably ends in a cold stop after the "time flies" lyric, instead of the segue into the reprise of "Broken" found on the album.

There is also a unique radio-only version that was issued on a double A-side single featuring the regular single mix on the other side. This was issued to radio stations for promotion only and has the catalog number IDEDJ 10. The radio mix is noticeably different from the regular single version in that it omits the flanging effects from the drum fill after the second chorus and the closing "time flies" vocals. Whereas the regular single credits the remix to Dave Bascombe, the radio version simply credits Chris Hughes as producer. This version of the single does not include "When in Love with a Blind Man" and has blue-coloured injection moulded labels.

B-side
"When in Love with a Blind Man" is a short song that served as the B-side to the "Head over Heels" single. It features bassist Curt Smith on vocals and features a synthesized shakuhachi flute, a popular musical motif for pop music in the 1980s.

Music video
The music video for "Head over Heels", filmed in June 1985, was the fourth Tears for Fears clip directed by music video producer Nigel Dick. A lighthearted video in comparison to the band's other promos, it is centred on Roland Orzabal's attempts to get the attention of a librarian (Joan Densmore), while a variety of characters (many played by the rest of the band), including a chimpanzee wearing a Red Sox jersey, engage in shenanigans in the library. The final scene shows Orzabal and the librarian as an older married couple. The video was filmed at the Emmanuel College Library in Toronto, Canada.

In popular culture
An edited version of "Head over Heels" is featured in the 2001 film Donnie Darko. According to director Richard Kelly on the DVD commentary, the scene in which the song was used was written and choreographed specifically with the song in mind.

A cover of the song was recorded in 2019 by Japanese Breakfast as a b-side of the “Essentially” single.

Formats and track listings

7": Mercury / IDEA10 (UK)
 "Head over Heels" (Remix) – 4:14
 "When in Love with a Blind Man" – 2:22
 Also released as a 10" single (IDEA1010) and as a four-leaf clover shaped picture disc (IDPIC10)

12": Mercury / IDEA1012 (UK)
 "Broken/Head over Heels/Broken" (Preacher Mix) – 7:53
 "Head over Heels" (Remix) – 4:14
 "When in Love with a Blind Man" – 2:22

CDV: Mercury / 080 062-2 (UK)
 "Head over Heels" (Remix) – 4:14
 "Sea Song" – 3:52
 "The Working Hour" – 6:27
 "Mothers Talk" (U.S. remix) – 4:14
 "Head over Heels" (video)

Charts

Weekly charts

Year-end charts

Certifications

References

1985 songs
1985 singles
Tears for Fears songs
Mercury Records singles
Phonogram Records singles
Music videos directed by Nigel Dick
Songs written by Roland Orzabal
Songs written by Curt Smith
Song recordings produced by Chris Hughes (record producer)
Progressive pop songs